Horringford is a settlement on the Isle of Wight, off the south coast of England. It is in the civil parish of Arreton.

The hamlet lies on the A3056 road, near to the larger settlement of Arreton. It contains the Horringford Manor.

Villages on the Isle of Wight